Hugo Dittberner (born Gieboldehausen 16 November 1944) is a German writer.

Early years
Hugo Dittberner is the son of an accountant. Between 1956 and 1965 Dittberner attended a boarding school in Bad Nenndorf.   After successfully completing his schooling he moved on to Göttingen University where he studied German literature and linguistics, history and philosophy, graduating in 1972.   He taught briefly at Karlsruhe University before settling to the life of a freelance writer.

Middle years
Dittberner has produced a number of volumes of poetry along with numerous novels and short stories.   His colloquial poetry style marked him as part of the "New Subjectivity" movement in the 1970s.   Both his poetry and his prose works deal with issues of daily life, frequently reflecting the interpersonal problems and relationship issues affecting members of the "'68 generation"

Between 1974 and 2000 Dittberner was a member of the Verband deutscher Schriftsteller (VS/ German Writers' Union).   He is a member of the German section of PEN International and of the Mainz based Akademie der Wissenschaften und der Literatur.

In 1979 he was the recipient of the Award of the Cultural Committee of German Industry. This was followed in 1981 by a Villa Massimo stipendium.

In 1984 he won the Niedersachsenpreis for journalism and in 1994 the Berlin Literature prize. In 1997 Dittberner was awarded a Worpswede Artistic Stipendium, and in 2001 a Cultural Stipendium from the Cultural Centre in Edenkoben. Further awards and prizes followed.

Official recognition
In 2005 the state government honoured him with the Order of Merit

Works
 Hugo Dittberner published works
 Donnervogel, Göttingen 1973 (together with Jens Wilke)
 Pasjes, Bergen, Holland 1973
 Rutschbahn, Kassel 1973
 Die frühen Romane Heinrich Manns, Göttingen 1974
 Heinrich Mann, Frankfurt am Main 1974
 Das Internat, Darmstadt [u. a.] 1974
 Der Biß ins Gras, Köln 1976
 Kurzurlaub, Darmstadt [u. a.] 1976
 Draußen im Dorf, Reinbek bei Hamburg 1978
 Jacobs Sieg, Reinbek bei Hamburg 1979
 Ruhe hinter Gardinen, Reinbek bei Hamburg 1980
 Die gebratenen Tauben, Reinbek bei Hamburg 1981
 Drei Tage Unordnung, Bielefeld 1983
 Der Tisch unter den Wolken, Göttingen 1986
 Wie man Provinzen erobert, Reinbek bei Hamburg 1986
 Die Wörter, der Wind, Bergen, Holland 1988
 Geschichte einiger Leser, Zürich 1990
 Im Lehm, Bergen, Holland 1992
 Das letzte fliegende Weiß, Bergen 1992
 Über Wohltäter, Zürich 1992
 Das letzte fliegende Weiß, Cologne 1994
 Wolken und Vögel und Menschentränen, Göttingen 1995
 Was ich sagen könnte, Stuttgart 1996
 Wasser-Elegien, zu Klampen Verlag, Springe 1997
 Arche nova, Göttingen 1998
 Versuch zu rühmen, Darmstadt 1999
 Vor den Pferdeweiden, Bergen, Holland 1999
 Morgenübungen, München 2000
 Das älteste Testament, zu Klampen Verlag, Springe 2007
 Das Seevokabularium. Wallstein-Verlag, Göttingen 2010,

References 

1944 births
Writers from Lower Saxony
20th-century German poets
21st-century German poets
21st-century German male writers
Living people
German male poets
German-language poets
20th-century German male writers
People from Göttingen (district)